Judo at the 2017 Commonwealth Youth Games was held at the Thomas Robinson Stadium in Nassau, Bahamas on 18 July 2017.

Medalists

Male

Female

Medal table

Participating nations
A total of 51 athletes from 17 nations competed in judo at the 2017 Commonwealth Youth Games:

References

External links
 
 Official website

Commonwealth Youth Games
2017 Commonwealth Youth Games events